S. P. Somtow (a rearrangement of his real name Somtow Papinian Sucharitkul; ; ; born 30 December 1952) is a Thai-American musical composer. He is also a science fiction, fantasy, and horror author writing in English. Somtow has both Thai and American citizenship.

He served as a musical consultant on the acclaimed Todd Field film Tár.

Youth
A descendant of the Royal Chakri dynasty (his grandfather's sister was a cousin and consort of King Vajiravudh), Somtow was born in Bangkok. He moved to England with his parents in 1953 at the age of six months. English was his first language. Somtow was educated at Eton College and at St Catharine's College, Cambridge. He returned to Thailand in the early-1960s for a five-year period, during which he became fluent in the Thai language. At age 11, he wrote a poem called "Kith of Infinity", which was published in the English-language Bangkok Post. Shirley MacLaine saw it, and thinking that it was written by a dead poet, included it in her autobiography, Don’t Fall Off the Mountain. The poem contains the line "I am not a man", as Somtow was not yet an adult. It is thought that this prompted MacLaine to assume that the author was a woman.

Science fiction
As a science fiction writer, Somtow is known for several series, among which are the Mallworld, Inquestor, and Aquila series. He first was published as Somtow Sucharitkul in the late-1970s in Asimov’s and Analog science fiction magazines. He wrote several stories and novels under that name before changing his pen name to S. P. Somtow.

Horror
He wrote Vampire Junction and a series of related novels and stories. He was president of the Horror Writers Association from 1998 to 2000. His other horror books include the werewolf-Western novel Moon Dance, the zombie-American Civil War novel Darker Angels, and the collections Tagging the Moon: Fairy Tales of L.A. and The Pavilion of Frozen Women. In 1997, he wrote the juvenile vampire novel, The Vampire's Beautiful Daughter. He also wrote and directed the cult horror film The Laughing Dead and co-wrote the Roger Corman-produced Bram Stoker's Burial of the Rats (1995).

Other literary works
Somtow's novel, Jasmine Nights, a semi-autobiographical novel set in Thailand in the 1960s, has become his best known fictional work. The historical fantasy The Shattered Horse holds that Hector's son Astyanax survives the fall of Troy and grows to adulthood to meet many of the characters of the Iliad.

Symphonic works
He has also composed five symphonies and a ballet, Kaki. Other musical compositions include the “Requiem: In Memoriam 9/11,” commissioned by the government of Thailand as a gift for the victims of the 9/11 events and inspired by the poetry of Walt Whitman, Emily Dickinson, and T. S. Eliot.

Stage works
In 2000, he composed Madana, the first orchestral Western opera by a Thai composer and based on a Thai language play by King Rama VI. The opera was in English. His second opera on a Thai theme, Mae Naak, premiered in 2003 and a third opera, Ayodhya, was first performed in November, 2006. His opera The Silent Prince was premiered in Houston by Opera Vista on 15 October 2010. A fifth opera, Dan no Ura, received its premiere in August 2014 in Bangkok.

He is currently at work on two operas, one an adaptation of his fantasy short story "The Fallen Country" and another about the life of Holocaust survivor, Helena Citronova. "The Snow Dragon", the adaptation of his fantasy story, is set to premiere 13 March 2015, at the Skylight Music Theatre in Milwaukee, Wisconsin, under the baton of Viswa Subbaraman.

In 2012 his musical, Reya the Musical, based on a serialized novel by his mother which had already been made into a popular Thai TV soap, premiered at the Aksra Theatre in Bangkok and ran for twenty performances.  A hybrid work combining ballet with opera, "Suriyothai", based on the life of a Thai Queen of the Ayuthaya Period, premiered on 23 August 2013.  He is currently working on a second musical, "Pob—the Musical" for December 2015 release.

Somtow is artistic director of Opera Siam. In 2006, Somtow Sucharitkul conducted the first Wagner opera in Southeast Asia, Das Rheingold, as part of a five-year project to bring the entire Ring Cycle to Southeast Asia by 2010. Various delays afflicted the project and it has yet to resume. He has conducted the Thailand premieres of many key repertoire operas such as Thaïs, Otello, and The Rape of Lucretia. He embarked on a venture to conduct all of Mahler's symphonies in Thailand, and the cycle was completed with No. 2 in 2015.

Performing ensembles
In the 1970s Somtow Sucharitkul formed the Temple of Dawn Consort with Dnu Huntrakul and Bruce Gaston, an eclectic performing ensemble devoted to a fusion of Thai and Western music styles and instruments, performing music by these the three composers. After his 1979 departure for the United States, the group evolved into other fusion ensembles, the most notable being Bruce Gaston's Fong Naam ensemble. On his return to Thailand, Somtow founded, in addition to Bangkok Opera, the Siam Philharmonic Orchestra and the Siam Sinfonietta, a youth symphony orchestra. He also founded the Orpheus Choir of Bangkok, traveling all over Thailand and performing many of Somtow Sucharitkul's pieces.

Television/animation

Somtow has written episodes of the animated television series Dinosaucers, C.O.P.S., and Chip 'n Dale: Rescue Rangers.

SEA Award speech
When Nobel Prize laureate Wole Soyinka withdrew as keynote speaker at the 2006 S.E.A. Write Awards ceremony in protest of the ouster of the elected government of Thaksin Shinawatra, Somtow, a critic of Thaksin, replaced Soyinka as keynote speaker. In his speech, Somtow berated Soyinka for boycotting the awards and claimed that in 50 years, he had never felt more free. Soon afterward, Somtow's opera Ayodhya was censored by state officials under the junta, who claimed that the on-stage death of the demon-king, Thotsakan, would constitute a "bad omen" for the military junta. Somtow agreed to modify the scene and was forced to sign a document giving officials the right to "immediately shut down the opera in mid-performance if, in their sole opinion, a breach of 'tradition' occurs."

Somtow has been critical of all sides in the political disputes following the 2006 Thailand coup. Although he was a critic of the populist government of Thaksin, Somtow stated that, "The righteous indignation of Thaksin's opposition, however, went beyond the pale when they started to say that the poor shouldn't vote because they're too stupid." Somtow praised a speech by Democrat Prime Minister Abhisit Vejjajiva for being, "so balanced, so reasonable, so intelligent, and so well thought through,..."

Awards and honors
Somtow won the World Fantasy Award for best novella in 2002 for The Bird Catcher, and has been nominated four other times. He has won the International Horror Guild Award, the John W. Campbell Award in 1981, the Locus Award for Best First Novel (1982, for Starship & Haiku), the HOMer Award, the American Horror Award and numerous other awards. He has been nominated for two Hugos and five Bram Stoker Awards. In 2008, he became one of the first recipients of the newly created Silpathorn Kittikhun Award, awarded by Thailand's Culture Ministry. The Silpathorn Kittikhun Award has been viewed as an alternative to the more "staid, traditional National Artist Awards." In December 2011, Thai newspaper The Nation selected him as one of the 40 most internationally acclaimed Thais.  In 2013 he was awarded the "Golden W" by the International Wagner Society for ten years of service in presenting the music of Wagner in the region. In 2022 he won the Best Actor award at the first season of Casablanca Film Factory Awards for his performance in the film ''The Maestro'' directed by Paul Spurrier.

References

External links 
S. P. Somtow’s web site
Bangkok Opera’s Official Website
The Orpheus Choir, created by Somtow Sucharitkul
The Siam Philharmonic Orchestra, created and directed by Somtow Sucharitkul

1952 births
20th-century American novelists
21st-century American novelists
Alumni of St Catharine's College, Cambridge
American fantasy writers
American male composers
21st-century American composers
American science fiction writers
John W. Campbell Award for Best New Writer winners
Living people
People educated at Eton College
S. P. Somtow
S. P. Somtow
S. P. Somtow
S. P. Somtow
S. P. Somtow
World Fantasy Award-winning writers
21st-century conductors (music)
21st-century American male musicians
S. P. Somtow
S. P. Somtow
20th-century American male musicians